Sarut Nasri (born 8 June 1995) is a Thai professional footballer who plays as a goalkeeper.

References

External links
Sarut Nasri at Soccerway

1995 births
Living people
Sarut Nasri
Association football goalkeepers
Sarut Nasri
Sarut Nasri
Sarut Nasri
Sarut Nasri